Air Marshal Sreekumar Prabhakaran, AVSM, VM is a retired officer of the Indian Air Force. He is served as the Air Officer Commanding-in-Chief, Western Air Command. He assumed the office on 1 March 2022 and superannuated on 31 December 2022. Previously, he served as the Commandant of Air Force Academy, Dundigal.

Early life and education
Sreekumar Prabhakaran is a native of Kannur, Kerala. He is a graduate of Defence Services Staff College, Wellington and an alumnus of the prestigious National Defence Academy, Khadagwasla and National Defence College, New Delhi.

Career
Sreekumar Prabhakaran was commissioned as a fighter pilot in the Indian Air Force on December 22, 1983 from Air Force Academy, Dundigal. He has flying experience of over 4,800 hours on a variety of fighter aircraft and has commanded the venerable Surya Kiran display team.

Sreekumar Prabhakaran has commanded the Surya Kiran display team and under him the team has participated in over 150 accident free public display. The team was awarded the Chief of Air Staff's Unit Citation under his command.

With a long career of 37 years. He has served as senior directing staff (Air) at DSSC, Wellington and has commanded two flying bases. He also served as the Defence Attache at Cairo, Egypt from 2007 to 2010.

He served as the Senior Air Staff Officer (SASO) of South Western Air Command. He also served as Director General (Flight Inspection & Safety)

He assumed the charge of  Air Officer Commanding-in-Chief, Western Air Command on 1 March 2022 succeeding Air Marshal Amit Dev. He superannuated on 31 December 2022 and was succeeded by Air Marshal Pankaj Mohan Sinha.

Honours and decorations 
During his career, Sreekumar Prabhakaran has been awarded the Vayu Sena Medal (VM) in 2005 and the Ati Vishisht Seva Medal in 2022.

References 

Indian Air Force air marshals
Recipients of the Ati Vishisht Seva Medal
Recipients of the Vayu Sena Medal
Year of birth missing (living people)
Living people
Commandants of the Indian Air Force Academy
Indian air attachés
Commandants of College of Air Warfare
Defence Services Staff College alumni
National Defence College, India alumni